Willis Hall is a historic building on the campus of Carleton College in Northfield, Minnesota, United States.  It is listed on the National Register of Historic Places.

Willis Hall was the first building specifically built for the college.  The first students started attending classes at the former American House hotel in Northfield in 1867, but the building had some serious mechanical problems. Construction of a new building began in 1868, but construction was slow and halted before the building could be erected due to lack of funds. The president of the college, James W. Strong, traveled to New England in 1870 for a fundraising tour.  After Strong was injured in a railroad accident and subsequently recovered from his injuries, benefactor William Carleton donated $50,000 to the college to insure its survival.  His wife, Susan Willis Carleton, donated $10,000 to help clear the construction debt of the college's the first permanent building. The building was named Willis Hall in her honor. It was designed in the French Second Empire style by a prominent Minneapolis architecture firm, Alden and Howe. The upper floor was a men's dormitory, the first floor a chapel, and the rest of the building was lecture space and library.

On December 23 1879, a fire ravaged the building, gutting it entirely. It was rebuilt with minor changes to the exterior, as well as improvements to the chapel, a new classroom, and a furnace. From 1954 to 1979, Willis officially operated as the campus student union, and it housed the campus bookstore, the post office, a game room, a darkroom, lounges, and the KARL radio station (now known as KRLX). Currently, the building houses the economics department, the education studies department and the department of political science.

References

Buildings and structures in Rice County, Minnesota
Carleton College
National Register of Historic Places in Rice County, Minnesota
Second Empire architecture in Minnesota
University and college buildings on the National Register of Historic Places in Minnesota